Marie-Pierre Pruvot (also known under the pseudonym Marie-Pier Ysser; born 11 November 1935) is an Algerian-born French transgender woman who performed under the stage name Bambi. She performed in a transgender showgirl revue at Le Carrousel de Paris for approximately 20 years.

While performing regularly, she appeared in several documentaries, including the 1959 film Costa Azzurra, directed by Vittorio Sala and the 1963 film 90 notti in giro per il mondo, directed by Mino Loy. During her entertainment career, she acquired university degrees at the Sorbonne in Paris, subsequently becoming a teacher of literature in 1974. She was initially appointed in Cherbourg; two years later, she began teaching at Garges-lès-Gonesse, and remained there for the next 25 years. She was honored with induction into the Ordre des Palmes Académiques.

She was profiled in Sébastien Lifshitz's documentary film Bambi, which won the Teddy Award for Best Documentary Film at the 2013 Berlin International Film Festival.

Autobiographies 
 Pruvot, Marie-Pierre (2003). J'inventais ma vie. Éditions Osmondes, ASIN B006X19N58
 Pruvot, Marie-Pierre (2007). Marie parce que c'est joli. Éditions Bonobo

References

External links 
 
 Bambi's Story (English and French)
 Official website (French) 
 Biography (French)
 Biography (French)

French LGBT writers
French transgender people
Transgender entertainers
Transgender women
University of Paris alumni
1935 births
Living people
Officiers of the Ordre des Palmes Académiques
French educators
Transgender writers
French entertainers
Algerian LGBT entertainers
French LGBT entertainers